

The Beecraft Wee Bee was an American ultralight monoplane designed and built by Beecraft. It was described as the world's smallest plane. Later the Starr Bumble Bee II would claim that title.

Development
The Wee Bee was designed by William "Bill" Chana, Kenneth Coward, Karl Montijo and Jim Wilder, who designed the engine. They described it as big enough to carry a man and small enough to be carried by a man.

It was an all-metal cantilever mid-wing monoplane powered by a Kiekhaefer O-45-35 flat-twin piston engine. It had a conventional tail and fixed tricycle landing gear. The unusual feature was that the aircraft lacked any internal room for a pilot who had to fly it lying prone atop the fuselage.

Only a prototype registration NX90840 was built, and the type did not enter production. The prototype was destroyed when the original San Diego Air and Space Museum burned down in 1978. After the fire, a replica was built and is now on display at the new San Diego Air & Space Museum in Balboa Park.

Specifications

References
Notes

Bibliography

External links

 "Homemade Air Sled Weighs Less Than Pilot" , February 1949, Popular Science rare photos of the WeeBee—i.e. pages 137 to 139
'' "The Wee Bee: Saga of the World's Smallest Piloted Airplane", June 29, 2017

1940s United States civil utility aircraft
Prone pilot aircraft
Mid-wing aircraft
Aircraft first flown in 1948
Wee Bee
Single-engined tractor aircraft